I were a Norwegian black metal supergroup formed in 2006. The band features Immortal members Abbath and Armagedda, Gorgoroth bassist TC King, and Enslaved's Ice Dale. The band cites Bathory as one of their major influences.

History 
The band's debut album, Between Two Worlds, was released on 3 November 2006 in the United Kingdom and 14 November 2006 in the United States through Nuclear Blast Records. Their first and only live show was at the Hole in the Sky festival in Bergen on 26 August 2006. Currently, there are no more scheduled live shows. In 2007, Abbath stated that he had started working on new songs for the next album, although no further comment has been made since. Given Abbath's formation of the band Abbath in 2015 following his departure from Immortal along with I bassist TC King, it is unlikely that a future I album will emerge. As part of prompting their new project, Abbath covered I's Warriors in October 2015.

Style 
The band features Abbath's raw black metal vocals accompanied with a classic metal influenced sound.  Blasts beats and some of the more "erratic" structural traits of black metal have also been excluded, this gives the band more of a classic metal sound but the black metal influences are still evident giving the band a unique sound.

Members 
 Abbath Doom Occulta (Olve Eikemo) – vocals, guitar
 Ice Dale (Arve Isdal) – guitar
 TC King (King ov Hell, Tom Cato Visnes) – bass
 Armagedda – drums

Discography 
 Between Two Worlds (2006)

References

External links 
 Official website (archived)
 Official band page at Nuclear Blast

Norwegian black metal musical groups
Norwegian heavy metal musical groups
Norwegian viking metal musical groups
Musical groups established in 2006
2006 establishments in Norway
Heavy metal supergroups
Musical quartets
Musical groups from Norway with local place of origin missing
Nuclear Blast artists